The Embassy of Sweden in Lima is Sweden's diplomatic mission in Peru, located in the country's capital, Lima. The current resident ambassador is Maria Cramér.

History
Diplomatic relations between Peru and Sweden were established in 1930. A palace-like villa built in 1938 was bought by the then Building Board in 1940 as an ambassador's residence. The embassy was closed in 2001, and the Swedish ambassador in Santiago de Chile became accredited to Lima from 2001 to 2016.

Following a government decision on 11 December 2015, the embassy reopened in 2016. The embassy was inaugurated on 22 November 2016 by EU and Trade Minister Ann Linde together with a Team Sweden delegation.

See also
 Embassy of Peru, Stockholm

References

Peru
Sweden
Peru–Sweden relations